Terminus is the fourth serial of the 20th season of the British science fiction television series Doctor Who, which was originally broadcast in four twice-weekly parts on BBC1 from 15 to 23 February 1983.

In the serial, the alien time traveller the Fifth Doctor (Peter Davison) attempts to stop the fuel from a plague spaceship called Terminus from exploding and causing the destruction of the universe.

Terminus is the second of three loosely connected serials where the Black Guardian (Valentine Dyall) attempts to compel the alien Vislor Turlough (Mark Strickson) to kill the Doctor. It marks the final regular appearance of Sarah Sutton as companion Nyssa.

Plot
Under the Black Guardian's instructions, Turlough sabotages the TARDIS, causing parts of it to dissolve. As the field of instability threatens to engulf Nyssa's room, a door appears behind her and the Fifth Doctor tells her to go through it. The TARDIS, to save itself, has materialised aboard a spaceship heading for an unknown destination. The Doctor and Nyssa, while exploring the ship, encounter two raiders, Kari and Olvir, who are intent on plundering the ship's cargo.

When the raiders' ship abandons Kari and Olvir, it becomes apparent that the spaceship is actually a transport carrying Lazars, sufferers of a leprosy-like disease, to a space station named Terminus. The station is owned by Terminus, Inc., which claims that a cure exists there, but no-one has returned from it. Nyssa, separated from the Doctor, is infected by the disease and ushered away with the rest of the Lazars. Terminus is manned by the Vanir, guards clad in ornate radiation armor. They are slave labour, kept alive only by regular doses of a drug called "hydromel", which is supplied by the corporation.

The Doctor discovers that Terminus is at the centre of the known universe and finds this information unsettling. Nyssa, meanwhile, is given over to the Garm, a giant dog-like biped, who takes her to a chamber and exposes her to radiation. The Doctor and Kari find the control room of Terminus and he realises that Terminus is also a time ship. In some unspecified past, the fuel that powered it became unstable and the now dead pilot had tried to jettison it while still in the time vortex. The tank exploded, and the outrush of energy started "Event One" – the Big Bang – and hurled Terminus billions of years into the future. There is still one tank of unstable fuel left, and the computer has begun a countdown to jettison that too. However, where the first explosion created the universe, the second will undoubtedly destroy it.

Nyssa awakes to find out that she is no longer infected. The radiation cure works, but it is haphazard, with as many people dying from it as recovering. The Garm knows this, but is unable to refine it as he is controlled by the Vanir. Enlisting the Garm's help, the Doctor staves off the countdown long enough to disable the computer and cut the engine control wires. In return, the Doctor destroys the electronic control box, setting the Garm free.

Nyssa strikes a bargain with the Vanir – in exchange for synthesising hydromel and freeing them from the corporation's influence, they will turn Terminus from a leper colony into a true hospital, and with the Garm's help refine the radiation cure. Deciding that her scientific skills are needed more on Terminus, Nyssa elects to stay behind, bidding her friends a tearful farewell. As Tegan and the Doctor return to the TARDIS, the Black Guardian tells Turlough that this is his last chance to kill the Doctor.

Production

The production of Terminus was fraught with technical difficulties, including problems with costumes, delays due to electrical problems, and a mis-built set.  The result was that some scenes had to be recorded on improperly-lit sets, production ran seriously late, and several scenes were taped hastily, much to Davison's frustration. Stephen Gallagher originally wanted to call Kari "Yoni" until Eric Saward pointed out that it was the Sanskrit word for the female reproductive organ.

In this serial Nyssa drops her skirt in part two and remains in a slip for the remainder of the story. According to the script she was feeling ill and trying to loosen the pressure on her stomach, but this is not clear on screen. In an interview for the book Doctor Who: 25 Glorious Years, Sarah Sutton, who played Nyssa, suggests it was deliberate Fan Service:
'I still smile when I remember how the Production Office kept getting letters of complaint about Nyssa being too covered up. So that's why when I left the series in "Terminus" I decided to drop my skirt as a parting gesture to all those fans who had written in.

'Mind you, it caused such a stir at the time, and as I'm still being asked about it when I am interviewed, I'm not sure it was a wise thing to have done!'

Cast notes
Liza Goddard, who plays Kari, is the former wife of Sixth Doctor actor Colin Baker.

Outside references
The Vanir here are references to the Vanir of Norse mythology. Garm was the guard dog of Hel, the land of the dead.

Commercial releases

In print

A novelisation of this serial, written by Stephen Gallagher under the pseudonym "John Lydecker", was published by Target Books in June 1983. As with Warriors' Gate the novelisation has no chapters.

Home media
Terminus was released on VHS in January 1993. It was released as part of the Black Guardian Trilogy DVD on 10 August 2009. This serial was scheduled to be released as part of the Doctor Who DVD Files in Issue 140 on 14 May 2014.

References

External links

Target novelisation

On Target — Terminus

Doctor Who serials novelised by Stephen Gallagher
Fifth Doctor serials
1983 British television episodes